Mahadeva is a village in tehsil Ram Nagar of district Barabanki on the banks of river Ghaghra. 

Lodheshwar Mahadev Mandir an age-old temple of Shiva is located at the village. During the fair held on the occasion of Mahashivratri at Mahadeva millions of devotees throng the place.

References

External links
Mahadeva @ barabanki.nic.in

Cities and towns in Barabanki district